Santa Cruz de Cangas de Onís is a small Roman Catholic chapel in Cangas de Onís, the first capital of the Kingdom of Asturias, in what is now northern Spain. It was founded on an artificial mound (a pagan dolmen) by Favila, second king of Asturias, and his queen, Froiliuba. It was begun in 737 and consecrated that same year on 27 October according to its original foundation stone, which has been called the first literary monument of the Reconquista.

Santa Cruz originally housed the Cruz de la Victoria, an oak cross supposedly carried by Pelagius, Favila's father, at the Battle of Covadonga. It was probably the first church constructed after the Islamic invasion of Spain in 711.

The church was completely rebuilt on two occasions. First in 1632 and again after its destruction in the Spanish Civil War (1936). Then, local authorities decided to uncover the dolmen beneath it, which had been obscured by a church since the fourth century, when the first chapel was put up on that site. Of the original building only the foundation stone survives.

Burials
Favila of Asturias and his wife Froiluba

Images

See also
Asturian architecture
Catholic Church in Spain

Notes

References

 

8th-century churches in Spain
Roman Catholic chapels in Spain
Cruz de CAngas de Onis
Pre-Romanesque architecture in Asturias
8th-century establishments in Spain
Churches completed in 737